Gustave Eiffel (1832–1923) was a French engineer and designer of the Eiffel Tower of Paris.

Gustave Eiffel may also refer to:

 Gustave Eiffel French School of Budapest, Hungary
 Gustave Eiffel University, Champs-sur-Marne, Marne la Vallée, France
 IAE Gustave Eiffel School of Management (est. 2007), Creteil, France
 Lycée Gustave Eiffel (disambiguation), several schools

See also

 Eiffel (disambiguation)
 Gustav (disambiguation)